Bostrycapulus aculeatus is a species of sea snail, a marine gastropod mollusk in the family Calyptraeidae, the slipper snails or slipper limpets, cup-and-saucer snails, and hat snails.

Distribution
This species occurs in Florida and the Bahamas.

Description 
The maximum recorded shell length is 30 mm.

Habitat 
The minimum recorded depth for this species is 0 m; maximum recorded depth is 80 m.

References

External links
 http://www.stri.si.edu/sites/collinlab/tree_species/bostrycapulus.html
 http://stri.si.edu/collinlab/tree_species/details.php?id=41

Calyptraeidae
Gastropods described in 1791
Taxa named by Johann Friedrich Gmelin